Endangerment is a type of crime involving conduct that is wrongful and reckless or wanton, and likely to produce death or grievous bodily harm to another person. There are several kinds of endangerment, each of which is a criminal act that can be prosecuted in a court. In some U.S. states, such as Florida, substantially similar language is used for the crime of culpable negligence.

The offense is intended to prohibit and therefore deter reckless or wanton (of a cruel or violent action, deliberate and unprovoked conduct) that wrongfully creates a substantial risk of death or serious injury to others.

Various laws specify several types of endangerment:

Child endangerment and animal endangerment: placing a child or animal in a potentially harmful situation, either through negligence or misconduct.
Reckless endangerment: A person commits the crime of reckless endangerment or wanton endangerment if the person recklessly engages in conduct which creates substantial jeopardy of severe corporeal trauma to another person. “Reckless” conduct is conduct that exhibits a culpable disregard of foreseeable consequences to others from the act or omission involved. The accused need not intentionally cause resulting harm. The ultimate question is whether, under all of the circumstances, the accused's demeanor was of that heedless nature that made it actually or imminently dangerous to the rights or safety of others.
 Public endangerment is usually applied to crimes which place the public in some form of danger, although that danger can be more or less severe according to the crime. It is punished most frequently in Canada.

In the U.S, endangerment can range from a misdemeanor to a felony. For example, the New York Penal Code §120.20 defines reckless endangerment in the second degree (class A misdemeanor) as conduct that "creates a substantial serious risk of injury to another person", and §120.25 deals with reckless endangerment in the first degree (class D felony), which is conduct that shows a "depraved indifference to human life" and "creates a grave risk of death to another person". In addition, §145.25 codifies reckless endangerment to property as a class B misdemeanor.

See also
Criminal negligence
Depraved-heart murder
Manslaughter
Willful violation

References

Crimes